Krebs is the German and Danish word for "crab" and "cancer" (in German, both the zodiac sign and the disease; in Danish the latter is "kræft"). It may refer to:

Places 
 Krebs Formation, a geologic formation in Missouri
 Krebs Group, a geologic group in Oklahoma, preserving fossils dating back to the Carboniferous period
 Krebs, Oklahoma, a city in Pittsburg County, Oklahoma, nicknamed "Little Italy"
 Krebs-see, a lake in Kreis Herzogtum Lauenburg, Schleswig-Holstein, Germany
 Mount Krebs, a 1,630 metres rock peak, in the ridge of Lillie Range, near the foothills of the Prince Olav Mountains, Antarctica
 Krebs Ridge, on the east coast of Palmer Land, Antarctica

People 
 Albert Krebs (1899–1974), the German Nazi Gauleiter in Hamburg in the time of the Third Reich
 Allen Krebs, Marxian economics professor who founded the Free University of New York (FUNY)
 Andreas Samuel Krebs (1766–1818), Danish-Norwegian army officer
 Angelika Krebs (born 1961), German philosopher
 Annabell Krebs Culverwell (1902–1998), AnnaBell took the name Columba when signing her paintings and writings,
 Arthur Constantin Krebs (1850–1935), French officer and pioneer in automotive engineering
 Beatrice Krebs (1924–2011), American operatic mezzo-soprano, musical theatre actress, and voice teacher
 Bernt Krebs, German scientist
 Brian Krebs (born 1972), American computer security journalist
 Carl Immanuel Krebs (1889–1971), Danish doctor, humanitarianist and explorer, third child of Johanne Margrethe Busch
 Charles Joseph Krebs FRSC FAA FRZS (born 1936), professor emeritus of population ecology
 Chris Krebs, US attorney and former Director of the Cybersecurity and Infrastructure Security Agency
 Christopher B. Krebs, Associate Professor of Classics at Stanford University
 Diether Krebs (1947–2000), German actor
 Edward H. Krebs (born 1944), former Pennsylvania legislator
 Edwin G. Krebs (1918–2009), biochemist
 Emil Krebs (1867–1930), German polyglot and sinologist
 Ernst Krebs (wrestler) (born 1914, date of death unknown), Swiss wrestler
 Ernst T. Krebs (1912–1996), American chemist and promoter of purported alternative cures for cancer
 Ervin Krebs (1909.1972), Hungarian coxswain
 Florian Krebs (born 1988), German footballer
 Francis Krebs (born 1946), American Bishop of the Ecumenical Catholic Communion who is currently serving as Presiding Bishop.
 Friedrich Krebs (died 1493), an early German organ builder
 Friedrich Krebs (mayor), the mayor of Frankfurt, Germany from 1933 to 1945
 Gaëtan Krebs (born 1985), French football midfielder
 Gene Krebs, member of the Ohio House of Representatives from 2000
 Georg Ludwig Engelhard Krebs (1792–1844), German apothecary and natural history collector
 George Krebs (1872–1939), American football player and coach
 Germaine Émilie Krebs (1903–1993), fashion designer
 Hans Krebs (Wehrmacht general) (1898–1945), German general
 Hans Adolf Krebs (1900–1981), biochemist (Krebs cycle / citric acid cycle)
 Hans Krebs (SS general) (1888–1947), Moravian-born Nazi SS Brigadeführer executed for war crimes
 Henrik J. Krebs (1847–1929), Danish-born American immigrant and founder of the Krebs Pigments and Chemical Company
 Helmut Krebs (1913–2007), German tenor
 Henrik J. Krebs (1847–1929), Danish-born American industrialist
 Hermano Krebs,  Fellow of the IEEE in 2014, for studies on rehabilitation robotics and neuro-rehabilitation
 Jacob Krebs (1782–1847), American politician, Jacksonian member of the U.S. House of Representatives
 Jim Krebs (1935–1965), American basketball player
 Joe Krebs (1943–2021), American television news reporter
 Johann Baptist Krebs (1774–1851), German opera singer and director, vocal pedagogue, Freemason and esoteric writer
 Johann Jacob Friedrich Krebs (c.1749–1815), American fraktur artist
 Johann Ludwig Krebs (1713–1780), German composer, student of J.S. Bach
 Johann Tobias Krebs (1690–1762), composer, father of J. L.
 Johann Tobias Krebs (literary scholar) (1718–1782), scholar of classical and Hebrew literature
 Johanne Cathrine Krebs (1848–1924), Danish painter and women's rights activist
 John Hans Krebs (1926–2014), German-born California politician
 John Krebs, Baron Krebs (born 1945), scientist and Principal of Jesus College, Oxford
 John Krebs (racing driver) (born 1950), American professional stock car racing driver
 John Michael Krebs (1804–1867), Presbyterian clergyman of the United States
 Karin Krebs (née Burneleit, born 1943) East German former middle-distance runner
 Mitch Krebs, American television anchor
 Martha Krebs, theoretical physicist
 Martin Krebs (born 1956), German prelate and diplomatic service of the Holy See since 1991
 Nathalie Krebs (1895–1978), Danish potter
 Nicholas of Cusa, birth name Nicholas Krebs (1401–1464), cardinal, philosopher, jurist, mathematician and astronomer
 Nina Krebs Ovesen (born 1996), Danish professional racing cyclist
 Otto Krebs (1873–1941), German industrialist and art collector
 Paul Joseph Krebs (1912–1996), American Democratic Party politician
 Paula Krebs, the Executive Director of the Modern Language Association of America (MLA)
 Pete Krebs, American musician, member of the punk-pop band Hazel
 Peyton Krebs (born 2001), Canadian ice hockey player
 Pierre Krebs, the German founder of Thule-Seminar, an extreme-right nationalist organization with strong Neopaganist roots
 Poul Krebs (born 1956), Danish pop / rock singer, songwriter and musician
 Rahel Krebs, aka Jaël Malli (born 1979), Swiss frontwoman and lead singer of the band Lunik (1998–2013)
 Richard Krebs (1906–1996), German athlete
 Ricardo Krebs Wilckens (1918–2011), German Chilean historian
 Richard Julius Hermann Krebs, known as Jan Valtin, spy
 Rick Krebs (born 1949), role-playing game and simulation game designer
 Robert Krebs, railroad company president
 Rockne Krebs (1938–2011), American artist and sculptor
 Sándor Krebs (1926–2007), Hungarian sports shooter
 Shantel Krebs (born 1973), American businesswoman and former South Dakota Secretary of Stat
 Stanley LeFevre Krebs (1864–1935), American psychologist and salesmanship lecturer
 Susan W. Krebs (born 1959), Maryland politician
 Thomas L. Krebs, American securities and finance attorney
 Torsten Krebs (born 1973), German sport shooter
 Valdis Krebs, American-Latvian researcher and consultant in the field of social and organizational network analysis
 Werner G. Krebs, American data scientist

Fictional people 

 Karl Krebs, character in Robert Harris' alternate history Fatherland
 Maynard G. Krebs, television sitcom character (The Many Loves of Dobie Gillis)
 Main character of Ernest Hemingway's story "Soldier's Home"

Organizations 
 Krebs Commercial Car Company, a motor company and military trucks manufacturer, active from 1917 to 1939 in Clyde, Ohio
 Germaine Emilie Krebs (or Grès), French haute couture fashion house
 Krebs Pigments and Chemical Company, a manufacturer of lithopone and titanium dioxide founded in 1902 by Henrik J. Krebs 
 Krebs School, a private school located in Stockholmsgade in Copenhagen, Denmark

Other uses 
 Krebs's fat mouse (Steatomys krebsii), a species of rodent in the family Nesomyidae
 Krebs cycle, a biochemical system important for the metabolism of sugars and fats
 Krebs–Henseleit solution, developed by Hans Krebs and Kurt Henseleit
 Krebs, was an armed German trawler that was sunk in 1941 in Operation Claymore
 Sir Hans Krebs Lecture and Medal, annually award by the Federation of European Biochemical Societies (FEBS)

See also 

 Krab (disambiguation)
 Crab (disambiguation)
 Krebs House (disambiguation)
 Related surnames
 Kreps (disambiguation)

German-language surnames
Jewish surnames
Surnames from nicknames